Honifaqan (also Romanized as Ḩonīfaqān and Ḩanīfqān; also known as Ḩownīfaqān and Khonīfaqān) is a village in Khvajehei Rural District, Meymand District, Firuzabad County, Fars Province, Iran. At the 2006 census, its population was 113, in 34 families.

References 

Populated places in Firuzabad County